Little Voices is a 2011 short student film that was directed and written by Christopher McFall. The film was released on 23 March 2011 and stars David Bower as a deaf man struggling to cope with losing his partner. Filming took place during August 2010.

Synopsis
Quint (David Bower) is a deaf-mute who has recently lost the love of his life. The death sends Quint reeling and he finds himself incapable of coping with this reality. The film spans a day in Quint's life and shows his obsession with typography, as he imagines people speaking in subtitles.

Cast
Clare Elizabeth Alberie as August (as Claire Alberie)
David Bower as Quint
Jon Griffin as Officer Clarendon
Richard Highgate as Officer Walbaum (as Richard Roberts)
Rebecca Hurst as June
John Jenner as Officer Brody

References

External links
 

2011 films
Welsh films
Student films
English-language Welsh films
2010s English-language films